My Best Friend's Girl may refer to:

 "My Best Friend's Girl" (song), a song by The Cars from the album The Cars (1978)
 "My Best Friend's Girl", a song by Steps from the album Steptacular (1999)
 My Best Friend's Girl (2008 film), a romantic comedy starring Dane Cook and Kate Hudson
 My Best Friend's Girl (1983 film), a film directed by Bertrand Blier
 My Best Friend's Girl (novel), a book by Dorothy Koomson

See also
 My Best Friend's Girlfriend, a 2008 Filipino romantic comedy film